The  Staunton Gambit is a chess opening characterised by the moves:

1. d4 f5 (the Dutch Defence) 
2. e4 

White sacrifices a pawn for quick , with the idea of launching an attack against Black's , which has been somewhat weakened by 1...f5. Black can decline the gambit with 2...d6, transposing to the Balogh Defence, but accepting the pawn with 2...fxe4 is considered stronger.

Although the Staunton Gambit was once a feared weapon for White, it is rarely played today, since theory has shown how to neutralise it, and White scores only about 50 percent.

The ECO codes for Staunton Gambit are A82 and A83.

Gambit accepted
After 2...fxe4, play usually proceeds 3.Nc3 Nf6.

Main line: 4.Bg5
The main line runs 4.Bg5, first played by Howard Staunton against Bernhard Horwitz in London, 1846.

After 4.Bg5, a common trap is 4...d5 5.Bxf6 exf6 6.Qh5+ g6 7.Qxd5 Qxd5 8.Nxd5 when White has regained his pawn, and since his knight is attacking the pawns on both c7 and f6, will come out a pawn ahead. Instead, Black usually tries to develop quickly and fortify his kingside, giving back the pawn if necessary, with 4...Nc6 5.d5 (White can regain the pawn with 5.Bxf6 exf6 6.Nxe4, but after 6...Qe7, White has no good way to defend the knight. Ne5 6.Qd4 Nf7, while 6.Qe2 is a modern alternative.

4.f3
White can also try 4.f3 in the style of the Blackmar–Diemer Gambit, whereupon White gets good compensation after 4...exf3. So Black generally plays 4...d5 5.fxe4 dxe4.  Black can also try 4...e3, returning the pawn in order to hinder White's development.

4.g4?!
4.g4 (the Bayonet Attack or Tartakower Variation) fails to provide enough compensation after 4...h6!

See also
 List of chess openings
 List of chess openings named after people

References

External links

The Staunton Gambit 1.d4 f5 2.e4
Annotated games

Chess openings
1846 in chess